Yelena Vladimirovna Terleyeva (Russian: Еле́на Владимировна Терле́ева, alternatively transliterated as Elena Terleeva) (born March 6, 1985 in Surgut, USSR) is a Russian singer, best known for her chart-topping single  "Solntse" (Russian:  Солнце).

Early life
Terleyeva was born in the subarctic city of Surgut to a family of a music teacher and an army officer. Shortly after her birth, the family moved to Novy Urengoy in the Yamalo-Nenets Autonomous Okrug. She studied piano and vocals in a local music school while growing up. At the age of 15, she participated in the Russian televised music competition Morning Star, where she won her poule. After finishing secondary school, she moved to Moscow to study pop and jazz vocals at the Institute of Modern Arts, from which she graduated in 2005. Before rising to prominence, she sang regularly in clubs. Later, she achieved a Master of Fine Arts from the Moscow State University.

Career

Terleyeva rose to prominence in Russia following her participation in the second season of Fabrika Zvyozd on Channel One Russia. Terleyeva remained among the favourites for the victory during the season, but eventually placed second behind Polina Gagarina. However, since, the show's creative producer Maxim Fadeev has claimed that Terleyeva should have been the rightful winner of the show as she received the most televotes during the final, unlike what was shown to the audiences. After Fabrika Zvyozd, Terleyeva signed with Fadeev's label Monolit Records. 

Initially focused on receiving her education, in 2005, Terleyeva returned to the public eye and competed alongside Jam in the Russian preselection of the Eurovision Song Contest 2005. With their duet "No More War", they won the first semi-final, ahead of Dima Bilan and Anastasiya Stotskaya on 4 February 2005. Eventually, in the final of 25 February, the duo finished sixth. Their song "No More War" however charted in the Russian TopHit radio airplay charts, peaking at #81. That same year, Terleyeva released her first self-penned single "Mezhdu mnoyu i toboyu" (between me and you), which became her breakthrough song. The single went to peak the airplay charts at #29. Her subsequent single "Bros'" also entered the TopHit charts.

In 2006, she guest-starred in Fabrika Zvyozd, singing "Mezhdu mnoyu i toboyu" in duet with Prokhor Chaliapin. Later that same year, she released her next single "Solntse" (Sun), which topped the TopHit airplay charts in April 2007 and stayed on top for eight weeks straight. For "Solntse", Terleyeva received her first and only Golden Gramophone Award. At the end of the year, she performed the song at Pesnya goda, where it was highlighted as one of the largest radio hits of the year. During the Russian Music Awards in 2007, Terleyeva received nominations for Best Female Singer and Best Composition for "Solntse". In December 2007, she released "Lyubi menya" (Love Me), which also managed to top the TopHit charts. Terleyeva wrote and performed the song "Ty i ya" (You and I) for the soundtrack of the 2008 Russian motion picture Black Hunters. 

Following her departure from Monolit, Terleyeva changed her musical direction, focusing more on jazz music. As a result, she collaborated with jazz musician Alexander Novikov during this period, frequently performing with him at concerts. Her commercial output started to decrease for several years. In 2013, Terleyeva released two albums, PredIstoriya filled with jazz compositions and Solntse, which contained a mix with her biggest hits. The latter album was still released through Monolit Records. 

Between 2013 and 2019, she released a string of single that had different chart outcomes. In 2015, she released her single "Ne proshu" (I Don't Ask), followed by the single "Ukhodi" (Leave) in 2018. A year later, she released her self-penned song "Vdokh-vydokh" (Inhale-exhale).

Discography

Studio albums

Singles

Music videos

References

External links 

1985 births
Living people
People from Surgut
Fabrika Zvyozd
Institute of Contemporary Art, Moscow alumni
21st-century Russian singers
21st-century Russian women singers
Winners of the Golden Gramophone Award